Anatoli Badretdinov (born 1 September 1984), is a Russian futsal player who plays for Dinamo Moskva and the Russian national futsal team.

References

External links
UEFA profile
AMFR profile

1984 births
Living people
Russian men's futsal players
Sportspeople from Sverdlovsk Oblast